In pyrotechnics a comet is a block attached to the outside of a shell or launched freely, which burns and emits sparks as the shell is rising, leaving a trail in the sky.  Some comets use a matrix composition with small stars embedded in it.  The matrix composition burns with little light but ignites the stars, producing the effect.  Some freely-launched comets contain crossette breaks, which explode and break the comet into pieces to produce a branching effect.

Comets intended for use indoors near an audience, such as at a rock concert, are typically freely-launched projectiles designed to completely consume themselves to reduce the hazard to audience members.

External links
A pyroguide article on Comets

Fireworks